Patricio Andrés Graff (born 18 November 1975) is an Argentine former footballer who played as a left back, and currently the manager of Spanish club Elche CF Ilicitano.

Playing career
Graff was born in Rosario, Santa Fe. He represented Rosario Central, Feyenoord, FC Den Bosch, Sporting de Gijón, Rayo Vallecano, CD Numancia, Hércules CF and Club de Gimnasia y Esgrima La Plata, in a 15-year senior career.

From 2002 to 2005, while in Spain, Graff experienced two relegations from La Liga (one with Rayo, another with Numancia). In that country, in which he played nearly one decade, he appeared in 235 official matches, 94 of those in the top division; he scored his only goal in the competition on 2 March 2005, as Numancia held hosts Levante UD to a 1–1 draw.

Coaching career
Graff began working as a manager with former club Rosario Central's youth academy. Subsequently, he acted as assistant to his compatriot Pablo Sánchez at C.D. Universidad de Concepción and O'Higgins FC.

Remanining in Chile, Graff then helped Coquimbo Unido promote from the Primera B to the Primera División in 2018. The following season, he led the team to the fifth place with the subsequent qualification for the first stage of the Copa Sudamericana.

In December 2019, even though he had renewed his contract shortly after, Graff signed a two-year deal with O'Higgins and was officially presented late in the month, being received at the Monasterio Celeste by 16 fans (in reference to the Tomé Tragedy) and the board of directors.

Managerial statistics

References

External links
Argentine League statistics 

Beijen profile 

1975 births
Living people
Argentine people of German descent
Footballers from Rosario, Santa Fe
Argentine footballers
Association football defenders
Argentine Primera División players
Rosario Central footballers
Club de Gimnasia y Esgrima La Plata footballers
Eredivisie players
Feyenoord players
FC Den Bosch players
La Liga players
Segunda División players
Sporting de Gijón players
Rayo Vallecano players
CD Numancia players
Hércules CF players
Argentine expatriate footballers
Expatriate footballers in the Netherlands
Expatriate footballers in Spain
Argentine expatriate sportspeople in the Netherlands
Argentine expatriate sportspeople in Spain
Argentine football managers
Chilean Primera División managers
Primera B de Chile managers
Coquimbo Unido managers
O'Higgins F.C. managers
Club Deportivo Palestino managers
Elche CF Ilicitano managers
Argentine expatriate football managers
Expatriate football managers in Chile
Argentine expatriate sportspeople in Chile